Potti, also written as Potty, is a sect of Brahmins in Kerala state of India. The surname Potti is also used in Arya Vyasa Community in Andhra Pradesh and Telangana, in which Potti means short.

Etymology
Potti is a Tamil word meaning "deep respect for someone" and is used for Malayali Brahmins except the Nambudiris.

History
At present, Pottis are often identified as Embrandiris or Tulu Brahmin immigrants. However, there were three classes of Pottis based on three periods of settlement in Kerala.

There are Pottis of Kerala origin and Tulu origin. Pottis of Tulu origin came to Malabar region as temple priests in the 16th century. Those who migrated from South Kanara to Malabar are known as Embrandiri or Embranthiri, while those who settled in Shivalli were known as "Shivalli Brahmins", they continue to be based in Udupi or Sivalli in South Kanara.

References 

Brahmin communities of Kerala
Indian surnames
Malayali Brahmins